Marianne Narciso  (born 8 August 1991) is a Filipino women's international footballer who plays as a forward. She is a member of the Philippines women's national football team. She was part of the team at the 2015 AFF Women's Championship. On club level she played for Green Archers United scoring three goals at the 2015 PFF Women's Cup against University of the Philippines-Y and on the collegiate level for the UST Lady Booters in Philippines.

References

1991 births
Living people
Filipino women's footballers
Philippines women's international footballers
Place of birth missing (living people)
Women's association football forwards
University of Santo Tomas alumni
University Athletic Association of the Philippines footballers